Rashesh Shah (born 30 September 1963) is an Indian businessman and the chairman and CEO of the Edelweiss Group, one of India's leading diversified financial services conglomerates. He is also the co-founder of Edelweiss Financial Services Limited (EFSL).

He also delivers many speeches, interviews, and lectures on topics related to financial markets, development, macroeconomic policies, and related matters.

Early life and education 
Rashesh Shah was a student of Bharatiya Vidya Bhavan and Manav Mandir High School of Mumbai. He completed a Bachelor of Science degree in statistics from KC College, Mumbai and spent a year studying exports at Indian Institute of Foreign Trade (IIFT).

After that, he completed his MBA from Indian Institute of Management (IIM), Ahmedabad in 1989. He then joined ICICI.

Rashesh Shah enjoys reading and is a fitness enthusiast who enjoys playing tennis. An avid runner, he has participated in a triathlon and continues to participate in marathons across the world.

Family
Born in a Gujarati  family, Rashesh Shah was the first one to study in an English-medium school. He is married to Vidya Shah, CEO of EdelGive Foundation, whom he met at IIM. The couple has two children, Neel, born in 1995,  and Avanti, born in 2000.

Career
Rashesh Shah has an experience of more than 28 years in the financial market sector. He quit his job at Prime Securities to start Edelweiss along with co-founder Venkat Ramaswamy. The company was founded in November 1995 and commenced operations in February 1996
They started with a small office in Mumbai's Fountain area with just three employees.

Currently, Rashesh and Vidya Shah hold nearly 27% stake in Edelweiss.
Besides, Rashesh Shah has worked as a member of the executive committee of the National Stock Exchange (NSE) and the Stock Exchange Board of India (SEBI). He reviewed Insider Trading Regulations at SEBI. He has also held the chair of the National Council on Capital Markets formed by Associate Chambers of Commerce and Industry of India (ASSOCHAM)

He has served as the President of Federation of Indian Chambers of Commerce and Industry (FICCI) in 2017-18.

A regular commentator on macro-economic policies, development matters and financial markets in the mainstream and financial media, Rashesh is a part of the High Level Task Force on Public Credit Registry for India as well as the Insolvency Law Committees.

Allegations

In January 2020, the Enforcement Directorate (ED) issued summons to Edelweiss Group and Shah to join a case involving an alleged Rs 2,000 crore violation of FEMA provisions. This pertains to Mumbai based Capstone Forex Pvt Ltd. Rashesh Shah has rejected allegations of FEMA violations.

Philanthropy
He is also deeply involved in EdelGive Foundation, Edelweiss's philanthropy arm, which was set up in 2008 by his wife Vidya, with an aim to provide expertise of financial sector to the not-for-profit sector.

Achievements
Rashesh Shah was honoured with the HeforShe pin by the UN Women, for creating a gender equal world. 
Rashesh Shah won 'Entrepreneur Of The Year – Financial Services award ' from EY in 2018.
Rashesh Shah won the award of ‘Entrepreneur of the Year’ from Bombay Management Association in 2008–2009. 
He also bagged the 'Special Award for Contribution to Development of Capital Markets in India' from Zee Business at India's Best Market Analyst Awards of 2011.

References

https://www.thehindubusinessline.com/companies/rashesh-shah-rejects-allegations-of-fema-violations/article30550321.ece

External links 

Edelweiss official website

Living people
1963 births
Indian chairpersons of corporations